Phasmahyla exilis, the mottled leaf frog, is a species of frog in the subfamily Phyllomedusinae. It is endemic to Brazil. Its natural habitats are subtropical or tropical moist lowland forests and rivers.
It is threatened by habitat loss.

References

Exilis
Endemic fauna of Brazil
Amphibians described in 1980
Taxonomy articles created by Polbot